The VDNKh weather station is the principal weather station in Moscow, Russia. It opened in 1948 on the grounds of the All-Russia Exhibition Centre. Temperature and precipitation readings at VVC weather station form the official weather reports and historical statistics.

The station's World meteorological organization classification index is 27612.

Climatological data

See also

Climate of Moscow

References

Meteorological stations
Organizations based in Moscow
Exhibition of Achievements of National Economy
Buildings and structures built in the Soviet Union
Meteorology in the Soviet Union